Leroy Williams, professionally known by his stage name Mr. Lee, is an American record producer and entrepreneur from Houston, Texas. He has produced several albums, which achieved platinum and gold status, such as Scarface's My Homies, 2Pac's Still I Rise, Paul Wall's The Peoples Champ. He was one of the in-house producers of Rap-A-Lot Records, and a founder and CEO of Noddfactor Entertainment.

Partial production discography

1990s 
 1997
 Too Much Trouble - Too Much Weight
 5th Ward Boyz - Usual Suspects
 1998
 Scarface - My Homies 
 Devin the Dude - The Dude
 Do or Die - Headz or Tailz
 Geto Boys - Da Good Da Bad & Da Ugly
 1999
 Yukmouth - Thugged Out: The Albulation 
 Big Mike - Hard to Hit
 2Pac & Outlawz - Still I Rise

2000s 
 2000
 Scarface - The Last of a Dying Breed
 Do or Die - Victory
 Outlawz - Ride wit Us or Collide wit Us
 2001
 Yukmouth - Thug Lord: The New Testament
 2002
 Devin the Dude - Just Tryin' ta Live
 Outlawz - Neva Surrenda
 Hussein Fatal - Fatal
 Luniz - Silver & Black
 Big Syke - Big Syke
 Facemob - Silence
 2003
 Yukmouth - Godzilla
 Slim Thug & Lil' Keke - The Big Unit
 DMG - Black Roulette
 2004
 Z-Ro - The Life of Joseph W. McVey
 Boss Hogg Outlawz - Boyz-n-Blue
 2005
 Paul Wall - The Peoples Champ 
 Lil' Flip & Z-Ro - Kings of the South
 Z-Ro - Let the Truth Be Told
 Bun B - Trill  
 Slim Thug - Already Platinum
 2006
 Z-Ro - I'm Still Livin'
 Pimp C - Pimpalation
 Scarface - My Homies Part 2
 Trae tha Truth - Restless
 2007
 Trae tha Truth - Life Goes On
 Paul Wall - Get Money, Stay True
 Boss Hogg Outlawz - Serve & Collect
 2008
 Yukmouth - Million Dollar Mouthpiece
 Bun B - II Trill
 ABN - It Is What It Is
 Z-Ro - Crack
 Boss Hogg Outlawz - Back by Blockular Demand: Serve & Collect II
 Lil' Keke - Loved by Few, Hated by Many
 2009
 Slim Thug - Boss of All Bosses

2010s 
 2010
 Slim Thug - Tha Thug Show
 2011
 Boss Hogg Outlawz - Serve & Collect III
 2012
 David Banner - Sex, Drugs & Video Games
 2013
 Slim Thug - Boss Life
 2014
 Z-Ro - The Crown
 2015
 Pimp C - Long Live the Pimp
 2018
 Nipsey Hussle - Victory Lap

2020s 
 2021
 Drake – Certified Lover Boy

References

External links 
 Official website
 Mr. Lee discography at Discogs

Living people
American audio engineers
Southern hip hop musicians
American hip hop record producers
Year of birth missing (living people)